John Bradley (born May 10, 1971) is a former Democratic member of the Illinois House of Representatives, representing the 117th District from his appointment in June 2003 to his resignation in January 2017. He served as an Assistant Majority Leader from 2013 to 2017. The 117th district, located in Southern Illinois and parts of the Metro Lakeland area, includes all or parts of Benton, Buckner, Bush, Cambria, Carbondale, Carterville, Christopher, Colp, Crab Orchard, Creal Springs, Energy, Ewing, Freeman Spur, Granville, Hanaford, Herrin, Hurst, Johnston City, Macedonia, Marion, McLeansboro, Mulkeytown, North City, Orient, Pittsburg, Royalton, Sesser, Spillertown, Stonefort, Thompsonville, Valier, West City, West Frankfort, Whiteash, and Zeigler.

He resigned in January 2017. His district manager Jim Kirkpatrick was appointed to succeed him and sworn in on January 4, 2017.

References

External links
Representative John E. Bradley (D) 117th District at the Illinois General Assembly
By session: 98th, 97th, 96th, 95th, 94th, 93rd
 
John E. Bradley at Illinois House Democrats

1971 births
Living people
Democratic Party members of the Illinois House of Representatives
People from Harrisburg, Illinois
University of Texas alumni
University of Illinois College of Law alumni
Illinois lawyers
21st-century American politicians
People from Marion, Illinois